Eloá Pimentel hostage crisis refers to the kidnapping, holding hostage and murder of Brazilian 15-year-old girl Eloá Cristina Pimentel in October 2008; this crime, and the shooting of Pimentel's friend Nayara Silva were both committed by Eloá's ex-boyfriend Lindemberg Alves. The incident received major media exposure not only because of the shootings, but also because of the mistakes made by the police of São Paulo. Eloá Pimentel was held as a hostage for 100 hours – the longest kidnapping ever registered in the state of São Paulo. The trial of Alves started on February 13, 2012, exactly three years and four months after the crime.

The kidnapping 
On October 13, 2008, Eloá Pimentel, Nayara da Silva and two friends were working on a school project, when Eloá's 22-year-old ex-boyfriend, Lindemberg Fernandes Alves, broke into her apartment in Santo André, holding a pistol. He soon released the two boys, but held Eloá and Nayara. The GATE (Grupo de Ações Táticas Especiais, or Special Tactical Actions Group) closely followed the situation. On October 16, da Silva was eventually released by Alves, but she offered to return to the apartment, to try to negotiate with the kidnapper. After she entered the apartment, she was held hostage again. Hours later, shots were heard coming from the apartment, and the GATE decided to storm the apartment. They eventually stopped and immobilized him, but not before he could shoot Eloá twice (once in the head and other in the groin), and shoot once in Nayara's face.
Eloá, severely wounded, was taken to the hospital, but was brain dead due to brain damage and died on October 18, at 23:30.

Aftermath 
The body of Eloá Pimentel was buried in the Jardim Santo André cemetery, in Santo André, and the ceremony was attended by ten thousand people. Her heart, lungs, liver, pancreas, kidneys and cornea were donated, to the benefit of seven people. It was later discovered that Eloá's father, Everaldo Pereira dos Santos, was a suspect in the murder of two people in the state of Alagoas. Everaldo Pereira dos Santos ran away during the incident but was captured on December 28, 2009, in Maceió.

The trial of Lindemberg Alves Fernandes lasted 4 days, from February 13 to February 16, 2012. He was found guilty of all 12 crimes he committed, and condemned to 98 years and 10 months of imprisonment. Brazilian law, however, limits the penalty time to 30 years.

Controversy 
The incident was widely discussed because of the mistakes committed by the police, especially the fact that they allowed Nayara to return to the apartment. Marcos do Val, a Brazilian SWAT instructor, pointed out other mistakes, such as allowing the kidnapping to last for so many days, not shooting Lindemberg with a sniper, taking too long to storm the apartment after breaching the door, and not using the back door or the windows.

Media coverage
In 2016, an episode of the true crime documentary television series Investigação Criminal was released about the case.

References

External links 
 Eloá Pimentel hostage crisis at Google News

1993 births
2008 deaths
Murdered Brazilian children
People murdered in Brazil
Kidnapped Brazilian people
Hostage taking in Brazil
Kidnappings in Brazil
2008 murders in Brazil
Incidents of violence against girls